South Fermanagh may refer to:

The southern part of County Fermanagh
South Fermanagh (Northern Ireland Parliament constituency)
South Fermanagh (UK Parliament constituency)